Pon Pure Chemicals Group is an Indian chemical company. Its main subsidiary is Pure Chemicals Co.

History 
In 2009 Pon Pure Chemicals Group became a member of Indian Chemical Council. In 2013 it joined the Indo American Chamber of Commerce

Award
 in 2017, The First Award under Merchant Export Category from CHEMEXIL Ministry of Commerce and Industry (India)

References

Companies based in Chennai
Indian companies established in 1981
1981 establishments in Tamil Nadu
Chemical companies established in 1981